Szufnarowa  is a village in the administrative district of Gmina Wiśniowa, within Strzyżów County, Subcarpathian Voivodeship, in south-eastern Poland. It's the place of birth of the 80's pop singer and starlette Danuta Lato.

References

Szufnarowa